The Yakovlev Yak-19 (Russian: Як-19, USAF/DOD designation Type 7) was a prototype Soviet fighter built in late 1940s. It was the first Soviet aircraft to be equipped with an afterburning turbojet, the Klimov RD-10F that was derived from the German Jumo 004 engine. Only two examples were built as it was rejected for service by the Soviet Air Force.

Development and description
In April 1946, the Council of People's Commissars ordered several design bureaux (OKB  – Opytnoye Konstruktorskoye Buro), included that of Alexander Yakovlev, to develop a single-seat jet fighter to be equipped with a single Lyulka TR-1 turbojet engine. Yakovlev and his team were well aware that any derivative of their earlier Yak-15 and Yak-17 fighters, then under development, could not reach the required speed because of their thick wings and chose to begin a "clean-slate" design. Preliminary work used the same "pod-and-boom" layout as had been used in the earlier Yakovlev designs, although the cockpit was located in front of the engine. The TR-1 engine was plagued by delays and Yakovlev devoted most of his efforts to designs that used the RD-10.

By late June, Yakovlev had decided to use a more aerodynamically efficient "tubular" layout with the engine buried in the center of the fuselage. After it became clear that neither the TR-1, nor the imported British Rolls-Royce Nene or Rolls-Royce Derwent engines would be available to power the prototypes, Yakovlev settled on the newly available afterburning version of the RD-10. The first prototype was ordered to a very demanding schedule and was completed on 29 November 1946.

The Yak-19 had an flattened oval-shaped, metal semi-monocoque fuselage with the single-seat cockpit and its teardrop-shaped canopy positioned just forward of the  axial-flow RD-10F turbojet engine. Its air intake was in the nose and the afterburner was positioned at the rear of the fuselage, just below the tail structure. Fitted with tricycle landing gear, the main landing gear retracted inwards into the fuselage while the nose gear retracted forwards. The laminar-flow, two-spar, straight wing was mounted in the middle of the fuselage. It was equipped with modified Fowler flaps and Frise ailerons. The rudder was split into two sections by the horizontal stabilizers; the upper portion was fabric-covered while the lower half was metal-skinned. The pilot was protected by a bulletproof windscreen, a forward armor plate and an armored seat back. In addition, he was provided with an ejection seat. It was armed with two  Nudelman-Suranov NS-23 autocannon, each with 70 rounds.

Testing
The day after the first prototype was completed, it was trucked to Khodynka Field to begin taxiing trials. On 12 December it caught fire when a defective fuel gasket blew out; the repairs took a fortnight. Immediately before its maiden flight, a pair of experimental 23 mm Shpitalny Sh-3 autocannon replaced the NS-23s. It first flew on 8 January 1947 with Lieutenant Colonel Mikhail Ivanov, at the controls, although he was not the primary test pilot. The Yak-19 was grounded from 2 March to 18 May as it awaited a new engine. On 21 May, the afterburner was tested in flight for the first time. While the fighter was the first Soviet aircraft to be equipped with an afterburner, it was not the first one to use one in flight as the Aircraft 156 had done so over a month earlier. The second prototype first flew on 6 June and was almost identical with the first prototype. Changes included five degrees of dihedral to the horizontal stabilizer, a slightly revised vertical stabilizer and plumbing for a pair of  drop tanks underneath the wingtips.

During the manufacturer's flight tests, the Yak-19 became the first Soviet aircraft to exceed 900 km/h. Major Sergei Anokhin was the primary test pilot and reported that the aircraft had pleasant and predictable flying characteristics and presented no difficulties for the average pilot. Before the testing was completed, Anokhin led the jets participating in the flypast at Tushino Airfield on 3 August.

State acceptance tests began on 17 October, using the second prototype, and finished on 30 January 1948. The group of military test pilots concluded that the afterburner was unreliable and the aircraft was difficult to control in roll. Other complaints were focused on the cockpit; it was deemed was too small and lacked sufficient armor and heating or ventilation. They decided that the Yak-19 could not be recommended for service. Rather than modify the aircraft to address these problems, Yakovlev chose to cancel it entirely in favor of designs using the more-powerful Rolls-Royce Derwent-derived Klimov RD-500, like his Yak-23 and Yak-25 fighters then under development.

Specifications (Yak-19)

See also

Notes

Bibliography
 Gordon, Yefim & Kommissarov, Dmitry. Early Soviet Jet Fighters. Manchester, UK: Hikoki Publications, 2014. .

Further reading
 Gordon, Yefim, Kommissarov, Dmitry & Komissariov, Sergey. OKB Yakovlev: A History of the Design Bureau and Its Aircraft. Hinkley, England: Midland, 2005. 
 Green, William & Swanborough, Gordon. The Complete Book of Fighters. New York: Smithmark, 1994. 
 Gunston, Bill. The Osprey Encyclopedia of Russian Aircraft 1875–1995. London: Osprey, 1995. 
 Gunston, Bill & Gordon, Yefim. Yakovlev Aircraft Since 1924. London: Putnam Aeronautical Books, 1997.

External links

 Russian Aviation Museum

1940s Soviet fighter aircraft
Yak-019
Single-engined jet aircraft
Aircraft first flown in 1947